Navai Mahalleh (also Romanized as Navā’ī Maḩalleh; also known as Navā’ī Maḩalleh-ye Bozorg) is a village in Emamzadeh Abdollah Rural District, Dehferi District, Fereydunkenar County, Mazandaran Province, Iran. At the 2006 census, its population was 1,024, in 291 families.

References 

Populated places in Fereydunkenar County